Armand Salomon (born 2 February 1962) is a Dutch basketball coach. He currently serves as a director for Feyenoord Basketbal of the Dutch Basketball League (DBL). From 2014 until 2018, he coached Rotterdam.

Coaching career 
On 16 May 2014, Salomon was appointed head coach of Rotterdam Basketbal. In May 2018, Rotterdam reached the DBL semi-finals for the first time in 12 years, after upsetting Den Bosch in the quarter-finals, 1–2.

On 23 June 2018, Salomon became director of Feyenoord Basketball, the new name of the club, while Richard den Os took over head coaching duties.

Coaching record

Dutch Basketball League

|- 
| align="left" rowspan=4 | Rotterdam
| align="left" |2014–15
|30||8||22|||| align="center" | Lost in quarterfinals
|- 
| align="left" |2015–16
|30||9||21|||| align="center" | Lost in quarterfinals
|- 
| align="left" |2016–17
|30||12||18|||| align="center" | Lost in quarterfinals
|- 
| align="left" |2017–18
|39||17||22|||| align="center" | Lost in semi-finals
|- 
|-class="sortbottom"
| align="center" colspan=2|Career||129||46||83||||

References

1962 births
Living people
Dutch basketball coaches
Feyenoord Basketball coaches
Sportspeople from The Hague